The National Qualifications Authority of Ireland or NQAI (Údarás Náisiúnta Cáilíochtaí na hÉireann in Irish) was set up in 2001 under the Qualifications (Education & Training) Act, 1999 to develop and promote the implementation of a National Framework of Qualifications across education and training in Ireland. NQAI was dissolved and its functions were passed to Quality and Qualifications Ireland (QQI) on 6 November 2012.

The Authority's role
The Authority’s principal tasks were as follows:
To establish and enable the implementation of the National Framework of Qualifications (NFQ)
To enable improved arrangements for access, transfer and progression for learners
To facilitate the recognition of international awards

The National Framework
As one of its main functions, the NQAI established the National Framework of Qualifications (NFQ). The NFQ is a ten-stage system incorporating educational and training awards from certificate to doctoral level. Awards no longer made are included in the framework for reference purposes.

See also
 Education in the Republic of Ireland
 Institutes of Technology in Ireland
 List of universities in the Republic of Ireland
 State Examinations Commission

References

External links
 National Qualifications Authority of Ireland
 Quality and Qualifications Ireland (QQI), official site of NQAI's successor agency

Education in the Republic of Ireland
 
2001 establishments in Ireland